The Derby delle Due Sicilie ("Derby of the Two Sicilies") is an Italian Serie A derby between the Napoli and Palermo football clubs.

It represents the football challenge between the two historical capitals of the Two Sicilies.

Statistics

Source: worldfootball.net

References 

Due Sicilie